Helluopapua is a genus of beetles in the family Carabidae, containing the following species:

 Helluopapua cheesmani Darlington, 1971
 Helluopapua toxopei Darlington, 1968

References

Anthiinae (beetle)